Adventure Girl is a 1934 American adventure documentary directed by Herman C. Raymaker, based on dialogue written by Ferrin Frazier, starring and narrated by Joan Lowell. The screenplay is based on the autobiography of Lowell, The Cradle of the Deep, which later turned out to be a work of fiction.

Plot
Joan Lowell travels by sea with her father, Nicholas Wagner, as the captain, and two additional crew, William Sawyer and Otto Siegler. During their voyage, their ship is damaged in a hurricane, her mast broken. Coming upon the wrecks of other ships, they find a mast that they can use to replace their broken one. As the two crewmembers begin salvaging the mast, Lowell and Wagner explore other wrecks, where Lowell comes upon an old map which supposedly leads to ruins in the jungle which contain a precious emerald.

After replacing the mast, they continue their journey, but need to find a water supply to replenish their drinking water, which was also lost during the hurricane. Lowell and Sawyer take a rowboat to the coast, where they meet a native who takes them to his village. Lowell realizes that this village is on the map she discovered, and convinces the local leader, Maya, to allow her and Sawyer to explore. When the party comes upon the lost city, Lowell begins to search for the emerald. When their guide, Manola, and Maya realize Lowell's intention, they take her prisoner with the intent to burn her alive.  Sawyer rescues her from certain death, and the two escape back to their rowboat.  As they are pursued by the native villagers in their canoes, Sawyer dumps gasoline into the waters behind them, and sets it on fire. This prevents the villagers from continuing their pursuit, and the two erstwhile treasure hunters return to their ship.

Cast
 Joan Lowell as herself
 Captain Nicholas Wagner as himself
 William Sawyer as himself
 Otto Siegler as himself

Production

The screenplay was based on Lowell's novel, Cradle of the Deep, which at the time of its publishing was advertised as an autobiography. It was chosen by the Book of the Month Club, and became a best-seller in 1929.  However, shortly after becoming famous, the book was exposed as a work of fiction.

In 1935, Lowell sued Van Beuren Studios and Amedee J. Van Beuren for an accounting of the profits. Van Beuren promptly made a counter-claim for $300,000 damages allegedly sustained because of Lowell's "inexpert" performance in the picture.

Modern sources still cite this film as a documentary, however, at the time of its release, sources reviewed it as a work of fiction. The film was shot on location in Guatemala. In July 1934, it was reported that production had completed, with filming done in Central America. The film began previews in early August, with one of these previews occurring aboard the S.S. Columbia on August 1, 1934.

Shot in black and white, the climax of the film, the fire scene, was hand colored by Gustav Brock.

The film opened on August 17, 1934, at the Rialto Theater in New York City. Several marketing schemes were put in place to coincide with the film's opening, including a newspaper essay contest with the winner receiving a free trip to Haiti, fashion tie-ins featuring Joan Lowell, and theater lobbies decorated in jungle motifs.

Reception
Motion Picture Daily gave the film a good review as outdoor adventure, singling out the sea photography, and the colorization sequence by Brock. The Brooklyn Daily Eagle gave the film a mostly negative review, mostly due to the amateur nature of the actors, but they did compliment the photography, calling it "excellent", but a wasted effort. The Hollywood Reporter felt that it was a good family adventure film. The New York Daily News complimented Brock's coloring of the fire scene, and praised the cinematography in general. the New York Daily Mirror also praised the photography, while the New York World-Telegram called the film "as amusing and exciting an hour as you can imagine in the cinema." The Film Daily called it an "Unusual adventure film with good exploitation values." They also Lowell's acting as well as the photography.

References

External links
 
 
 

1934 films
1930s color films
Black-and-white documentary films
Films shot in Guatemala
Jungle adventure films
1934 documentary films
American documentary films
American black-and-white films
Van Beuren Studios
Films directed by Herman C. Raymaker
1930s American films